Boalefa Marvin Pule (born 7 April 1990) is a South African soccer player who plays as a goalkeeper for South African Premier Division side SuperSport United.

References

Living people
1990 births
People from Ngaka Modiri Molema District Municipality
South African soccer players
Association football goalkeepers
South Africa international soccer players
SuperSport United F.C. players
Bidvest Wits F.C. players
AmaZulu F.C. players
South African Premier Division players
Sportspeople from North West (South African province)